Marino Moretti (born Cesenatico, Italy; July 18, 1885 – July 6, 1979) was an Italian poet and author.

Moretti's mother instilled in him a love of literature. After a failed attempt at an acting career, he began writing poetry; his first work being published in 1903. During his career, Moretti wrote twenty novels, eight books of verses, three book-length memoirs, and many short stories. Among his better known works are The Voice of God (1920) and Widow of Fioravanti (1971). Moretti's home in Italy has been turned into a museum.

Works

Poetry

Il poema di un'armonia, Ducci, Firenze, 1903
La sorgente della pace, Ducci, Firenze, 1903
Fraternità, Sandron, Palermo, 1905
La serenata delle zanzare, Streglio, Torino, 1908
Poesie scritte col lapis, Ricciardi, Napoli, 1910
Poesie di tutti i giorni (1910–1911), Ricciardi, Napoli, 1911
Poemetti di Marino, Tipografia Edizione Nazionale, Roma, 1913
Il giardino dei frutti, Ricciardi, Napoli, 1916
Poesie (1905–1915), Treves, Milano, 1919
L'ultima estate (1965–1968), Arnoldo Mondadori Editore, Milano, 1969
Tre anni e un giorno (1967–1968), Mondadori, Milano, 1971
Le poverazze (1968–1972), Mondadori, Milano, 1973
Diario a due voci, Mondadori, Milano, 1973
Diario senza le date, Mondadori, Milano, 1974
Poesie scritte col lapis, Palomar, Bari, 2002

Prose

Il paese degli equivoci, novelle, Sandron, Palermo, 1907
Sentimento, libro per ragazzi, Sandron, Palermo, 1908
I lestofanti, novelle, Sandron, Palermo, 1909
Ah,Ah,Ah!, Sandron, Palermo, 1910
I pesci fuor d'acqua, novelle, Treves, Milano, 1914
Il sole del sabato, romanzo, Treves, Milano, 1916
La bandiera alla finestra, novelle, Treves, Milano, 1917
Guenda, romanzo, Treves, Milano, 1918
Conoscere il mondo, novelle, Treves, Milano, 1919
Adamo ed Eva, Milano, 1919
Personaggi secondari, novelle, Milano, 1920
Una settimana in Paradiso, novelle, Milano, 1920
Cinque novelle, novelle, Formiggini, Roma, 1920
La voce di Dio, romanzo, Milano, 1920
L'isola dell'amore, romanzo, Milano, 1920
Né bella né brutta, romanzo, Milano, 1921
Due fanciulli, romanzo, Milano 1922
I puri di cuore, romanzo, Milano, 1923
Mia madre, Treves, Milano, 1923
Il romanzo della mamma, Treves, Milano, 1924
La vera grandezza, novelle, Treves, Milano, 1926
Il segno della croce, Treves, Milano, 1926
Le capinere, novelle, Mondadori, Milano, 1926
Le più belle pagine di E. Praga, I. U. Tarchetti e A. Boito, a cura di Marino Moretti, Treves, Milano, 1926
Allegretto quasi allegro, novelle, Milano, 1927
Il trono dei poveri, (unico romanzo italiano ambientato nella Repubblica di San Marino)[11], Treves, Milano, 1927
Il tempo felice. Ricordi d'infanzia e d'altre stagioni, Treves, Milano, 1929
La casa del Santo sangue, romanzo, Mondadori, Milano, 1930
Via Laura. Il libro dei sorprendenti vent'anni, Treves, Milano, 1931
Sorprese del buon Dio, novelle, Mondadori, Milano, 1931
Guy de Maupassant: Una vita, traduzione di Marino Moretti, Mondadori, Milano, 1931
Fantasie olandesi, Treves, Milano, 1933
L'Andreana, romanzo, Mondadori, Milano, 1935
Parole e musica, Firenze, 1936
Novelle per Urbino, Urbino, 1937
Anna degli elefanti, romanzo, Mondadori, Milano, 1937
Scrivere non è necessario, Mondadori, Milano, 1937
Pane in desco, Mondadori, Milano, 1939
La vedova Fioravanti, romanzo, Mondadori, Milano, 1941
L'odore del pane, Morcelliana, Brescia, 1942
Cento novelle, Torino, 1942
I coniugi Allori, romanzo, Mondadori, Milano, 1946
Il fiocco verde, romanzo, Mondadori, Milano, 1948
Il pudore, romanzo, Mondadori, Milano, 1950 (rifacimento di Il tempo felice)
A Panzini: La cicuta, i gigli e le rose, a cura di Marino Moretti, Mondadori, Milano, 1950
I grilli di Pazzo Pazzi, Milano, 1951
Il tempo migliore, prose, Milano, 1953
Uomini soli, novelle, Milano, 1954
Doctor Mellifluus, romanzo, Milano, 1954
La camera degli sposi, romanzo, Milano, 1958
Il libro dei miei amici. Ritratti letterari, Mondadori, Milano, 1960

Theater

Leonardo da Vinci, teatro (with F. Cazzamini Mussi), Baldini e Castoldi, Milano, 1909
Gli Allighieri, teatro (with F. Cazzamini Mussi), Baldini e Castoldi, Milano, 1910
Frate sole, Milano, 1911
L'isola dell'amore, in "Rassegna italiana", aprile-maggio 1924

References

External links
Marino Moretti in Enciclopedia Treccani
Marino Moretti in Encyclopedia Britannica

1885 births
1979 deaths
Italian male poets
20th-century Italian poets
20th-century Italian male writers